George III, Count of Erbach (15 July 1548 – 26 February 1605), was Count of Erbach in Lauterbach and Breuberg.

Born in Erbach, he was the fifth and youngest child but only son of Eberhard XII, Count of Erbach-Freienstein and Margareta, a daughter of Count Philipp of Salm, Wild- and Rhinegrave of Dhaun.

Life 

Around 1560, the Elector Palatine enfeoffed George III (jointly with his father and his uncle Valentin II, Count of Erbach-Schönberg) with the district of Wildenstein.

After the death of his uncle George II, Count of Erbach-Reichenberg in 1569, George III reunited all the Erbach family possessions. Among the properties that he inherited was noted Reichenberg Castle, which he converted into a Renaissance-style fortress.

Between 1588 and 1590 he expanded Fürstenau Castle, which became in the seat of his government.

George III died in Erbach aged 56 and was buried in the Stadtkirche of Michelstadt, where in 1678 a family tomb for the counts of Erbach would be constructed.

After his death, his sons divided the territory:

 Frederick Magnus (1575–1618) inherited Fürstenau and Reichenberg.
 John Casimir (1584–1627) inherited Breuberg and Wildenstein.
 Louis I (1579–1643) inherited parts of Erbach and Freienstein.
 George Albert I (1597–1647), inherited Schönberg and Seeheim.

After Frederick Magnus's died without surviving male issue, in 1623 his brothers divided his share among themselves: John Casimir received Fürstenau, Louis received Michelstadt and Bad König, and George Albert received Reichenberg.

When John Casimir died unmarried in 1627, Louis received Wildenstein and George Albert received Fürstenau. When Louis died in 1643 without surviving male issue, George Albert inherited his possessions, thereby reuniting the Erbach possessions once again.

Family 

On 27 July 1567, George III married, firstly, Anna Amalia ( 1551 – 13 July 1571), a daughter of Count Johann IX of Sayn and his second wife Anna of Hohenlohe-Waldenburg. This marriage remained childless.

On 15 July 1572, George III married, secondly, Anna (11 April 1557 – 8 December 1586), a daughter of Frederick Magnus, Count of Solms-Laubach-Sonnenwalde and his wife Agnes of Wied.They had twelve children.

In Greiz on 11 November 1587, George III married, thirdly, Dorothea (28 October 1566 – 26 October 1591), a daughter of Heinrich XV Reuss, Lord of Greiz-Obergreiz and his wife Marie Salome of Oettingen. They had three children.

In Korbach on 2 August 1592, George III married, fourthly, Maria (8 April 1563 – 29 December 1619), widow of Count Josias I of Waldeck-Eisenberg and a daughter of Count Albert X of Barby-Mühlingen and his wife Maria of Anhalt-Zerbst (1 December 1538 – 25 April 1563). They had six children.

Notes

External links 
 Photo of his tomb
 Erbach Castle

Counts of Germany
House of Erbach
1548 births
1605 deaths
16th-century German people